Nicholas William Brown (born April 2, 1977) is an American lawyer who has served as United States attorney for the Western District of Washington since October 2021.

Education

Brown received his Bachelor of Arts degree from Morehouse College in 1999 and his Juris Doctor from Harvard University in 2002.

Career

Brown began his legal career as a Judge Advocate General in the United States Army, serving as both a prosecutor and defense counsel. His practice included being trial counsel at Joint Base Lewis–McChord, trial defense counsel for the United States Army Trial Defense Service, Fort Bliss, Texas and Bagdad, Iraq, and legal assistance attorney and tax officer for the U.S. Army Air Defense Artillery Center at Fort Bliss. From 2007 to 2013, he was an assistant United States attorney for the Western District of Washington. From 2013 to 2017, he served as general counsel to Governor Jay Inslee.

U.S. attorney for the Western District of Washington 

In January 2021, Senators Patty Murray and Maria Cantwell recommended Brown to the post of U.S. attorney for Western Washington.

On July 26, 2021 President Joe Biden nominated Brown to be the United States Attorney for the Western District of Washington. On September 23, 2021, his nomination was reported out of committee. On September 30, 2021, his nomination was confirmed in the United States Senate by voice vote. On October 8, 2021, he was sworn in by Chief U.S. District Judge Ricardo S. Martinez.

Personal life 

Brown was a contestant on Survivor: The Australian Outback in 2001.

References

External links
 Biography at U.S. Department of Justice

1977 births
Living people
21st-century African-American people
African-American lawyers
American consuls
American prosecutors
Assistant United States Attorneys
Harvard Law School alumni
Lawyers from San Francisco
Morehouse College alumni
Survivor (American TV series) contestants
United States Attorneys for the Western District of Washington
20th-century African-American people